Mircea Sasu, (5 October 1939 – 17 October 1983), was a Romanian football striker, who played for Minerul Baia Mare, UT Arad, Dinamo Bucharest, Farul Constanţa in Romania and Fenerbahçe SK in Turkey.

He was famous in Turkey for his freekick and direct corner goals.

Career statistics

International goals

Notes

References

External links
 
 
 

1939 births
1983 deaths
Sportspeople from Baia Mare
Romanian footballers
CS Minaur Baia Mare (football) players
FCV Farul Constanța players
FC Dinamo București players
FC UTA Arad players
Fenerbahçe S.K. footballers
Association football forwards
Olympic footballers of Romania
Romania international footballers
Liga I players
Süper Lig players
Expatriate footballers in Turkey
Romanian expatriate footballers